Ambrose Langley (10 March 1870 – 29 January 1937) was an English football player and manager. He was the manager of Hull City from 1905 until 1913. He was born in 6 South Street, Horncastle and played over 300 games for Sheffield Wednesday.

Langley was a full-back who began his playing career with his local side Horncastle, moving to Football Alliance side Grimsby Town in 1889, and joining Middlesbrough Ironopolis in 1891, winning Northern League title medals in both seasons with the Teesside club.

He joined First Division Sheffield Wednesday in 1893 winning an FA Cup winners medal in 1896. They also won the Second Division title in 1900 and the Football League title in 1903 and 1904 while Langley was at the club.

Despite suffering a rib injury that curtailed his career in the top flight, Langley was appointed as player-manager of Hull City in 1905. In his first season in charge, City finished in fifth place in the second division. In 1908–09 he led them to fourth place. In 1909–10 they finished third, and only missed out on promotion to the top flight on goal average, losing 3–0 to promotion rivals Oldham in their final game of the season, having won eleven and drawn one of their previous twelve games.

Langley resigned from Hull City at the end of the 1912–13 season and later managed Huddersfield Town.

He died in Sheffield at the age of 66.

References

External links
Ambrose Langley career The Sheffield Wednesday Archive.

1870 births
1937 deaths
English footballers
Grimsby Town F.C. players
Sheffield Wednesday F.C. players
Hull City A.F.C. players
English football managers
Hull City A.F.C. managers
Huddersfield Town A.F.C. managers
English Football League representative players
Association football defenders
FA Cup Final players